Torch Cay (previously known as Blue Island, Innocence Island and Hog Cay) is a privately owned island located east of Little Exuma at the southernmost point of the Exuma island chain. The island is 707 acres, making it the largest private island in the Bahamas. Torch Cay derives its name from the white torch tree (Amyris elemifera) and found amongst the land’s vegetation. It is home to Torch Cay Airport, the only airport on a private island worldwide where you can land an ultra-long-range or heavy private jet.

History

Originally known to the Exumas as God Rest the Dead Cay by Captain Mingo Rolle, Torch Cay’s name has changed over the years. Previous names include Blue Island, Innocence Island and Hog Cay.

In the year 1706, much of the island’s trade and shipping were disrupted by an era of piracy. Reigning Nassau and its surrounding islands were known as The Republic of Pirates, for over a decade. The Republic of Pirates' influence had the country under an informal dictatorship based on earlier maritime law and privateer codes. Torch Cay underwent a period of havoc as pirates looted and stole treasure from the island until British control was restored in 1718.

Torch Cay was a filming location for the 2006 film Pirates of the Caribbean: Dead Man's Chest.

Topography and climate

Torch Cay is situated along an east-west axis, with ridged coastlines and vantage points for seascapes. Elevations are 55 ft. to the north of the island's airport runway, peaking at more than 60 ft. and 85 ft. at existing residential properties. Torch Cay claims the highest point of elevation in the Exuma Cays, with hilltops reaching a maximum elevation of 148 ft.

Situated on one of the highest points of elevation in the Bahamas, rainfall drains inland as opposed to the sea, creating a fertile basin for agriculture. It also benefits from Saharan dust clouds that travel from Africa across the Atlantic yielding Red Soil.

Marine and wildlife 

Torch Cay is known for its iguana population as well as peacocks. It was previously used for sheep and hogs which are no longer on the island. Inhabiting the sea surrounding Torch Cay is marine life including sea turtles, southern stingrays, lemon sharks, and spotted sea hares.

Privacy and access 
Torch Cay is privately owned and limits access to residents, members and designated staff. It has an airport with a 6,000-foot-long landing strip to accommodate light-jets, midsize-jets, heavy-jets, and ultra long-jets and VIP airliners. Customs and immigration agents are available to arriving visitors.

Torch Cay is a 45-minute drive and 20-minute boat ride from Great Exuma’s international airport, and also reachable by boats, including water taxis and ferries.

See also
 List of islands of The Bahamas

References

Private islands of the Bahamas
Islands of the Bahamas